STOR may refer to:

 Short Term Operating Reserve, see National Grid Reserve Service
 STØR, American furniture chain
 STOR2RRD, an open-source software tool

See also
JSTOR, digital library
Stor (born 1987), Swedish rapper
Stör, a river in Schleswig-Holstein, Germany
Stör (Elde), a river in Mecklenburg-Vorpommern, Germany